Fox Nation is an American subscription video on demand service. Announced on February 20, 2018, and launching on November 27 of that year, it is a companion to Fox News Channel carrying programming of interest to its audience, including original opinion-based talk shows and documentary-style programs featuring Fox News personalities (which, as with its parent network, are produced from a conservative perspective), outdoor recreation-related programs, and other acquired programming. It also offers next-day streaming of Fox News primetime programs.

The "Fox Nation" name originates from a website Fox News had launched in 2009, which featured blogs by conservative and liberal commentators. The new service was announced for a debut in late 2018, and was described as catering to "superfans" of Fox News—which the network deemed to be "the most loyal audience in cable, if not all of television".

Programming
Some of the original programming on the service has included Nuff Said with Tyrus, What Made America Great with Brian Kilmeade, and Sincerely, Kat—hosted by The Greg Gutfeld Show panelist Kat Timpf. Diamond and Silk had a program on Fox Nation, but were dropped by Fox News in March 2020 amid their promotion of COVID-19 misinformation.

In 2020, the service began to acquire outdoor recreation-themed programming, including acquiring streaming rights to the former A&E reality show Duck Dynasty, and premiering the original hunting series Fox Nation Outdoors.

On March 29, 2021, the service began to carry Tucker Carlson Today—a spin-off of Tucker Carlson Tonight. Tucker Carlson also produces original documentaries for the service under the banner Tucker Carlson Originals.

In May 2021, Fox Nation began to stream Fox News primetime programs (such as Tucker Carlson Tonight and Hannity) on-demand the day after their original airing, branded as "Fox News Primetime All the Time". It also added a video simulcast of Dan Bongino's syndicated radio show, as part of an agreement for him to host a new Saturday night program on Fox News. In September 2021, Fox Nation greenlit a revival of former Fox series Cops for a 33rd season, after having previously been dropped by Paramount Network.

In March 2022, Fox Nation announced Duck Family Treasure, a new reality series starring Jase and Jep Robertson of Duck Dynasty fame. In April 2022, Fox Nation announced Historic Battles for America, a historical miniseries narrated by Kelsey Grammer. It also acquired Piers Morgan Uncensored from the British channel TalkTV, which is a sister to Fox News via sister company News Corp and News UK. In September 2022 Fox Nation premiered its first direct-to-streaming film, The Shell Collector, adapted from the novel by Nancy Naigle.

See also 
 The Daily Wire

References

External links 
 

Fox News
Internet properties established in 2009
Subscription video streaming services
Conservative media in the United States